Giorgio Mellacina (born 15 January 1961) is a retired Swiss football goalkeeper.

References

1961 births
Living people
Swiss men's footballers
AC Bellinzona players
FC Luzern players
Association football goalkeepers
Swiss Super League players
People from Bellinzona
Sportspeople from Ticino